The 1976 Pacific Coast Open, also known by its sponsored name Fireman's Fund International, was a men's tennis tournament played on indoor carpet courts at the Cow Palace in San Francisco, California in the United States. The event was part of the 4 Star category of the 1976 Grand Prix circuit and Barry MacKay was the tournament director. It was the 88th edition of the tournament and ran from September 27 through October 4, 1976. The singles event had a field of 64 players and eight spots in the main draw were available after a two-tier qualifying event consisting of more than 200 players. Third-seeded Roscoe Tanner won the singles title and $20,000 first prize money. The total attendance for the tournament was 41,000, down from the previous year's 55,000.

Finals

Singles
 Roscoe Tanner defeated  Brian Gottfried 4–6, 7–5, 6–1
 It was Tanner's 3rd singles title of the year and the 7th of his career.

Doubles
 Dick Stockton /  Roscoe Tanner defeated  Brian Gottfried /  Bob Hewitt 6–3, 6–4

References

External links
 ITF tournament edition details

Pacific Coast International Open
1976 World Championship Tennis circuit
Pacific Coast International Open
Pacific Coast International Open
Pacific Coast International Open
Pacific Coast International Open
Pacific Coast International Open